Clare Pooley is a British blogger and novelist.

Origins and education
Clare Pooley is the daughter of Peter Pooley CMG, a former Director-General of the European Commission. She was educated at Roedean School and Newnham College, Cambridge, from which she graduated with a degree in Economics.

Career
Pooley first pursued a career in advertising at J. Walter Thompson, in due course becoming a Managing Partner and Group Head, before leaving the work-place on the birth of her third child.

In 2015, Pooley began a blog, Mummy was a Secret Drinker, about her life following a resolution to give up alcohol. She blogged under a pseudonym until the announcement of her first book deal in September 2017.

Pooley’s first book, The Sober Diaries, was a narrative of her first year of sobriety and also included an account of her successful battle to overcome breast cancer.

In October 2018, it was announced that Pooley’s fictional debut, The Authenticity Project, had been the subject of a six-way auction, with Transworld securing UK and Commonwealth rights, Penguin Random House acquiring the US rights, and foreign rights sold in 29 other languages.

The Authenticity Project, published in 2020, was a New York Times Bestseller, and the winner of the RNA debut novel award. It was also awarded best novel in translation in the French Babelio awards.

Pooley’s second novel, titled The People on Platform 5 in the UK, and Iona Iverson’s Rules for Commuting in the USA, was published in 2022.

Personal life
Pooley is married to John Stevenson-Hamilton. The couple lives in London and has three children.

List of published works 
 THE SOBER DIARIES : how one woman stopped drinking and started living. Coronet Books: 2018 ISBN 1-4736-6190-0
 The Authenticity Project: The feel-good novel you need right now. Bantam Press: 2020 ISBN 978-1787631793

External links
 Mummy was a Secret Drinker, Clare Pooley’s blog.

References

British bloggers
21st-century British novelists
British temperance activists
People educated at Roedean School, East Sussex
Alumni of Newnham College, Cambridge